The Philadelphia Police Department (PPD or Philly PD) is the police agency responsible for law enforcement and investigations within the City of Philadelphia, Pennsylvania. The PPD is one of the oldest municipal police agencies, fourth largest police force and sixth largest non-federal law enforcement agency in the United States. Since records were first kept in 1828, at least 289 PPD officers have died in the line of duty.

The Philadelphia Police Department has a history of police brutality, intimidation, coercion, and disregard for constitutional rights, particularly during the tenure of Frank Rizzo as police commissioner (1967–1971) and mayor (1972–1980).  The patterns of police brutality were documented in a 1978 Pulitzer-Prize winning Philadelphia Inquirer series by William K. Marimow and Jon Neuman.

History
Philadelphia established a night watch in 1797, and employed its first police officers to patrol the streets in daytime in 1833. The two entities were combined in 1854 to form the Philadelphia Police Department, which was modeled on London's Metropolitan Police.

In 1870, a Philadelphia policeman shot and killed Henry Truman, an unarmed Black man in an alley. He was found guilty of manslaughter.

In 1887, the police department was put under control of the city's Department of Public Safety. Two years later, the PPD inaugurated its mounted patrol, which was disbanded in 2004 but restored in 2011.

In 1913, L. M. Gillespie became one of the first women police officers in Philadelphia. Major race riots broke out in 1919 and 1964. 

In 1970, a well publicized raid of the Black Panther Party occurred. During the weekend of August 29–30, 1970, seven Philadelphia policemen were shot during widespread racial tension.

In 1974, the Pennsylvania Crime Commission's "Report On Police Corruption And The Quality Of Law Enforcement In Philadelphia" concluded "that police corruption in Philadelphia is ongoing, widespread, systematic, and occurring at all levels of the police department. Corrupt practices were uncovered during the investigation in every police district and involved police officers ranging in rank from policeman to inspector. Specific acts of corruption involving improper cash payments to the police by gamblers, racketeers, bar owners, businessmen, nightclub owners, after-hours club owners, prostitutes, and others are detailed in the report. More than 400 individual police officers are identified by first name, last initial, and badge or payroll number as receiving improper payments in terms of cash, merchandise, sexual services, or meals."

A 1978 Pulitzer Prize-winning Philadelphia Inquirer series by William K. Marimow and Jon Neuman documented extensive patterns of police brutality in the PPD. The tenure of Frank Rizzo as police commissioner (1967–1971) and mayor (1972–1980) has frequently been characterized as a period in which the PPD engaged in extensive police brutality and discriminatory policing. 

In 1985, federal judge Clarence Charles Newcomer criticized the PPD for indiscriminately arresting a number Spanish-speaking people after an officer was killed, calling the arrests "unlawful" and "disgraceful".

In 1985, a residential eviction operation against an anarcho-primitivist organization called MOVE lead to a shootout between the group and the PDD. During the standoff, a PPD helicopter dropped C-4 explosive onto the house, often referred to as the MOVE compound, causing a fire that killed six adults and five children in the house, and burning 65 other houses to the ground. The incident was investigated by the Philadelphia Special Investigation Commission (MOVE).

In 2000, Thomas Jones was beaten while wounded by more than one dozen law enforcement officers.

In 2012, the PPD's education and/or experience requirements were increased to include at least one of four new options, including 60 college credits.

In 2017, the PPD announced they would be moving the headquarters to the old Inquirer Building.

In 2018, the Philadelphia Police Department's Gun Violence Reduction Task Force was founded within the Detective Bureau. The Task Force was created to focus on violent offenders/prior convicts in possession of firearms. 

In 2019, 72 Philadelphia police officers are taken off street duty over racist and hateful Facebook posts. In 2019, August 2019 Philadelphia shooting: Six PPD officers are shot and injured while serving a drug warrant.

In 2019, Commissioner Ross resigns amid sexual harassment claims within the organization.

In 2020, during the George Floyd protests in Philadelphia, Police Staff Inspector Joseph Bologna was suspended and charged with aggravated assault after he allegedly hit a student protester with a baton. Other incidents caught on video involving Bologna regarding the 2020 protests saw him tackling a female protester who had touched his bicycle, lunging at a journalist, and hitting a security guard. Previously in the 2000s, Bologna was videoed instructing his officers to turn off security cameras for a raid, and was suspended for "failing to properly supervise". A West Philadelphia unit he managed in the 2010s accumulated many misconduct complaints.

In 2021, the city of Philadelphia paid $2 million to a black woman who in 2020 was pulled from a car and beaten by PPD officers, as well as separated from her toddler for hours. The Fraternal Order of Police posted pictures on social media claiming "This child was lost during the violent riots in Philadelphia, wandering around barefoot in an area that was experiencing complete lawlessness. The only thing this Philadelphia Police Officer cared about in that moment was protecting this child." The officers involved in the beating of the woman and her separation from the toddler have since been fired.

In 2021, a PPD detective was reassigned and investigated after the department received evidence indicating she had attended the January 6 rally in support of overturning the 2020 presidential election result that preceded the U.S. Capitol attack.

A 2021 report found that of more than 9,000 civilian complaints against PPD officers, "only 0.5% of civilian allegations resulted in any recorded consequence beyond a reprimand." The study found that not a single allegation of civil rights violations (including racial profiling and racial slurs by officers) was upheld.

Notable investigations 
1894-95, Detective Frank P. Geyer investigated H. H. Holmes, one of America's first serial killers who confessed to killing twenty-seven men, women, and children, some of which were later determined to be alive. Holmes killed his business partner, Benjamin Pitezel, in Philadelphia and later killed three of Pitezel's young children (two in Irvington, and one in Canada). Detective Geyer is credited with finding the bodies of the three children after a cross-country, international investigation. 
1981, PPD officer Daniel Faulkner was fatally shot by Mumia Abu-Jamal (né Wesley Cook) while performing a routine traffic stop of the latter's brother, William Cook. A jury convicted Abu-Jamal, a former Black Panther Party member, of first degree murder. He was sentenced to death in 1982, but in 2011 prosecutors said they would drop their pursuit of his execution and agreed to accept de facto life imprisonment without parole. The incident, subsequent trial and Abu-Jamal's conviction remain controversial in the US and around the world.
1999, serial killer Gary Heidnik was executed by lethal injection. Heidnik kidnapped, tortured and raped six women and kept them prisoner in his Philadelphia basement. A jury convicted Heidnik of the first degree murders of two of the women and sentenced him to death.
2001, American Ira Samuel Einhorn, a.k.a. "The Unicorn Killer" (born May 15, 1940), was extradited from France back to Philadelphia to stand trial for the 1977 murder of Holly Maddux. Einhorn was an outspoken activist in the 1960s and '70s. In 1981, Einhorn fled to Europe to avoid the trial. In 1993, Einhorn had a trial in absentia and was convicted of first degree murder. In 2002, he was retried and again convicted. Einhorn was sentenced to life in prison without parole.
2012, Antonio Rodriguez, a.k.a. "The Kensington Strangler", received three life sentences for murdering three woman in 2010. The PPD convinced Rodriguez to confess after arresting him.
2013, a federal jury convicted drug lord Kaboni Savage and his sister, Kidada, of orchestrating the 2004 firebomb murders of a witness's six family members and of conspiring to participate in a violent drug enterprise. The jury convicted Kaboni of 12 murders in total and he was later sentenced to death.

Present day

The PPD employs over 6,400 sworn officers and over 800 civilian personnel, and patrols an area of 369.4 km2 (142.6 mi2) with a population of almost 1.5 million. The department is subdivided into 21 patrol districts, and like many other large municipal police forces, it incorporates many special units such as a K-9 squad, SWAT, bomb squad, community relations unit, and marine unit.  The highest-ranking officer is Commissioner Danielle Outlaw.

Organization
The head of the PPD is the commissioner, who is appointed by the mayor. The current commissioner is Danielle Outlaw (2020 - present).

Under the commissioner are two three-star deputy commissioners. The First Deputy Commissioner heads Field Operations. The Deputy Commissioner and Chief Administrative Officer heads Organizational Services, Strategy, and Innovation.

The Office of Field Operations is headed by the three-star First Deputy Commissioner of Field Operations, currently Myron Patterson (2016 – Present). The force comprises two commands, Patrol Operations and, Specialized Operations and Homeland Security; each command is headed by a two-star Deputy Commissioner. The Specialized Operations and Homeland Security command is headed by a two-star Deputy Commissioner, currently Dennis Wilson, and divided into two bureaus, Specialized Investigations and Homeland Security Bureau; each is headed by a chief inspector and further subdivided into several units.

The Office of Organizational Services, Strategy, and Innovation is headed by the three-star Deputy Commissioner and Chief Administrative Officer, currently Dennis Wilson is fulfilling these duties in addition to his normal duties.

Patrol Operations is headed by a two-star Deputy Commissioner of Patrol Operations, currently Melvin Singleton, who oversees both the patrol and detective units. Patrol Operations is divided into two regional commands, Regional Operations Command (North) and Regional Operations Command (South). Each regional command is headed by a chief inspector, and is subdivided into three divisions (ROC-North: East, Northwest, Northeast; ROC-South: Central, Southwest, South). Each division is headed by an inspector. A division comprises three or four districts; there are 21 patrol districts in all, and each district is headed by a captain. Each district is subdivided into three or four police service areas (PSA's), each headed by a lieutenant, for a total of 64 PSA's citywide.

In January 2013, Commissioner Ramsey announced changes to the command structure of the department lowering the number of deputy commissioners from 9 to 6. Ramsey only replaced one of the deputies who was promoted from staff inspector of the Internal Affairs Bureau to deputy commissioner of the Office of Professional Responsibility.

Mounted units

The beginnings of the mounted unit can be traced to the Fairmount Park Mounted Guard created in 1867.  In 1889 the Philadelphia Police Mounted Patrol Unit was established.  The Philadelphia Police unit survived until 1952, however, the Fairmount Park unit would be used for parades and crowd control measures.  The Fairmount Park Mounted Guard became the Fairmount Park Police in 1966, but maintained the same responsibilities.  In 1972, Mayor Frank Rizzo found it unnecessary for taxpayers to fund two separate police departments, and merged the Fairmount Park Police into the Philadelphia Police, creating the Park Division. The mounted unit was once again used to patrol the streets of Philadelphia. The mounted unit survived to celebrate 100 years in 1989, but was disbanded in 2004 due to budgetary cuts by Mayor John F. Street's administration. On July 18, 2008, Philadelphia Police Commissioner Charles H. Ramsey confirmed that plans are in the works to recreate the mounted unit.
The Philadelphia Inquirer again reported on June 2, 2009, that Ramsey hoped to revive the unit once the city was in a better financial standing. The continued recreation of the Mounted Unit took an additional step forward on October 31, 2011, when the city announced plans to build a new facility for the unit in Fairmount Park.

Ranks within the Philadelphia Police Department

Rank descriptions

To be promoted in the Philadelphia Police Department, police officers must finish their first year in the department. Then, when the next Corporal or Detective test is announced, they are eligible to take the test. Philadelphia PD Test for Corporal and Detectives is a written multiple choice test, lasting two to three hours. Also part of an officer's score is based on seniority.

The ranks of Corporal and Detective have the same pay grade, but have different functions. The rank of Corporal is the first supervisory rank. Corporals are "operations room supervisors" and are responsible for overseeing a patrol district's operations room, or a special unit's operations; i.e., ensure that reports are submitted accurately and in a timely manner, etc. Only rarely do Corporals work the street. A Corporal must have a minimum of a year's experience as a police officer.

Sergeants command a squad of officers, making assignments to beats, assigning traffic details, helping to supervise the radio room, commanding Marine Unit patrol boats and performing other similar tasks. When assigned to the Detective Bureau, a Sergeant interviews suspects and witnesses, assigns Detectives to cases and investigates clues, among other duties. Sergeants must have a minimum of two years experience as a Police Officer, or a year's experience as a Corporal or Detective.

The rank of Lieutenant is a managerial rank. Lieutenants command an assigned area in a police district or a specialized unit, such as a traffic unit. If assigned to the Detective Bureau, a Lieutenant supervises an investigation. Lieutenants must have a minimum of one year's experience as a sergeant.

The rank of Captain is the first command rank. Captains either command police districts or direct the activities of a specialized unit. When assigned as a detective, a Captain organizes and directs surveillance activities and police raids, prepares cases, interviews and interrogates suspects and testifies in court. Captains must have a minimum of one year's experience as a Lieutenant.

Staff inspectors are usually departmental administrative officers, serving on the police Command Staff under a commissioner or deputy commissioner. They are generally assigned to inspect police divisions, districts and units, evaluate police practices, equipment and personnel, and make recommendations for improvement where necessary; however, they may also command units and divisions. Staff Inspectors must have a minimum of one year's service as a Captain.

Inspectors are senior executive officers who typically command divisions and supervise officers under their command during any major police action, disaster or emergency. Inspectors must have a minimum of one year's service as a Staff Inspector or Captain.

Chief Inspectors are senior departmental administrative officers who either command bureaus within the department or who inspect police divisions, districts and units, evaluate police practices, equipment and personnel, and make recommendations for improvement where necessary. Chief Inspectors must have a minimum of one year's service as a Staff Inspector.

Deputy Commissioners and above are appointed by the city managing director with mayoral approval, not by the city civil service. Deputy commissioners are usually in charge of a regional command.

The two First Deputy Commissioners head the Office of Field Operations and the Office of Organizational Accountability.

The commissioner is appointed by the city managing director with mayoral approval, and is in charge of the entire department.

Detectives

Detectives are part of the Detective Bureau, and may be assigned to Detective Divisions, or specialized units like Homicide, Shooting Investigation Group, Organized Crime/Intelligence, Special Victims Unit, Gun Permits Unit and Background Investigation. The commanding officer of a detective division (a Captain) reports to the Inspector of Detective Bureau Headquarters. The ranking supervisor at Detective Bureau Headquarters is the Chief Inspector of the Detective Bureau. Detectives are not considered supervisory personnel, despite being equivalent to a Corporal in pay grade. Detectives are a civil service rank of their own, and take orders from a Sergeant.  There are also Police Officers who serve in an investigative capacity, such as in the Juvenile Aid and Special Victims Units. Police Officers who are assigned to the Detective Bureau are paid the same pay as a Police Officer assigned to patrol.

Unlike most law enforcement agencies, the Philadelphia Police Department Detective Bureau does not maintain the ranks such as Detective Sergeant or Detective Lieutenant, etc. The supervisors (Sergeant, Lieutenant & Captain) in the Detective Bureau can be transferred back to patrol, and are required to maintain a uniform. Also, unlike other departments such as NYPD, Chicago PD, and LAPD, Philadelphia Police Detectives do not have a uniform that can be worn during details or funerals. The prescribed attire of a Philadelphia Police Detective is proper business attire, and the rank of Detective is a permanent, plainclothes, civil service assignment. In the Philadelphia Police Department, the rank of Detective can only be made by a civil service exam and there are no grade differentiations. This is in contrast to NYPD that has the ability to make field promotions to the rank of Detective for an outstanding performance or circumstance.

Highest-ranking officer by year

Police Marshals
 John J. Keyser, 1850–1853
 John K. Murphy, 1853–1855

Chiefs of Police

 Samuel G. Ruggles, 1855–1867
St. Clair A. Mulholland, 1867–1872
 Kennard Jones, 1872–1879
 Samuel L. Given, 1879–1884
 James Stewart, 1884–1887
 James Lamon, 1887–1892

Superintendents of Police

 Robert Linden, 1892–1899
 Harry M. Quick, 1899–1904
 John B. Taylor, 1904–1912
 James Robinson, 1912–1920
 William B. Mills, 1920–1931
 Joseph E. Lestrange, 1931–1936
 James H. Malone, 1936–1937
 Edward Hubbs, 1937–1940
 Howard P. Sutton, 1950–1952

Police Commissioners

 Thomas J. Gibbons, 1952–1960
 Albert N. Brown, 1960–1962
 Howard R. Leary, 1962–1965
 Edward J. Bell, 1966–1967
 Frank L. Rizzo, 1967–1971 (first Italian American commissioner, later Mayor of Philadelphia)
 Joseph F. O'Neill, 1971–1980
 Morton B. Solomon, 1980–1984
 Gregore J. Sambor, 1984–1985
 Robert F. Armstrong, 1985–1986 
 Kevin M. Tucker, 1986–1988 (First commissioner from outside the police department since the 1920s)
 Willie L. Williams, 1988–1992 (first African American commissioner, later chief of the LAPD)
 Thomas M. Seamon, May-Aug 1992 (acting)
 Richard Neal, 1992–1998
 John Timoney, 1998–2002 (formerly a police consultant)
 Sylvester Johnson, 2002–2008
 Charles H. Ramsey 2008–2015
 Richard Ross Jr. 2016–2019
 Christine Coulter 2019–2020 (interim)
 Danielle Outlaw 2020–present

Demographics
The PPD's officers are and have been of many ethnicities. A large number of Irish Americans have been PPD officers since the 1850s.

 Male: 70%
 Female: 30%
 White: 57%
 African-American/Black: 33%
 Hispanic: 8%
 Other: 1.5%

Bureaus
 Internal Affairs
 Homeland Security
 Narcotics
 Detective (to include Special Investigations) 
 Training
 Administrative Services
 Support Services
 Intelligence
 Expressway Patrol

Awards and honors

Decorations
See: United States law enforcement decorations#Philadelphia Police Department
 Sgt. Robert F. Wilson III Commendation for Valor
 Commendation for Bravery
 Commendation for Heroism
 Commendation for Merit
 Commendatory Citation
 RNC Service Ribbon
 Military Service Ribbon
 Covid Ribbon

George Fencl Award

The George Fencl Award, named in honor of Philadelphia Police Officer George Fencl, is given by the Daily News to a Philadelphia Police Officer who exemplifies compassion, fairness, and civic commitment.  The award was first given in 1986.

Officers who died on duty
Over 260 Philadelphia Police Department officers have died on duty. In 1996, Lauretha Vaird became the first female PPD officer to be killed in the line of duty from gunfire.

See also

Criminal Justice Center (Philadelphia)
 List of law enforcement agencies in Pennsylvania
 39th District corruption scandal— "a persistent pattern of brutality and corruption among a cadre of Philadelphia Police Department officers, primarily from the Department's 39th District"
 Philadelphia Fire Department
 Philadelphia Highway Patrol
 :Category:Philadelphia Police Department officers

References

External links

 
 List of Philadelphia Police Department line-of-duty deaths from Officer Down Memorial Page
 Articles with Philadelphia Police Corruption tag from CBS Philadelphia

 
Government departments of Philadelphia
Municipal police departments of Pennsylvania